Isaac Reingold (Yitskhok, Itsik, יצחק רײנגאָלד) is the pen name of Isaac Toomim ( תּאומים יצחק) 1873-1903), a Russian-born American poet, lyricist, and singer.

Born in 1873 in Oder, near Loytsk (Lutsk), Volhynia, Ukraine, into a Chasidic family. He received a strict religious education; his father was bitterly opposed to the Enlightenment and a fervent believer in brotherhood and equality.

His poetry and his couplets—often set to melodies of famous English-language popular songs—were popular with working-class audiences.  He sang well and performed in concert halls and workers' gatherings.  His songs were published in: Lider-magazin, Di idishe bihne, and Teglikher idisher kuryer. He also wrote an opera, Al nahares bovl (By the rivers of Babylon).

He died October 21, 1903 in Chicago.

Books
Reingold's books printed by Chicago publisher Yankev Lidski include:
 Der velt zinger, prekhtige folks-lieder (The world singer, superb folksongs) (1894)
 A bintel blumen, folks-gedikhte (A bouquet of flowers, folks poems) (1895)
 Di strune, oyservehlte theater und folks lieder mit bakante englishe melodyen (The string, extraordinary theater and folk songs with well-known English melodies) (1896)
 Di nayeste reyngolds theater und folks lieder, gezungen mit englishe melodyen (The newest of Reyngold’s theater and folk songs, sung with English melodies) (1896)
 Der fonograf, komishe kupleten und theater lieder (The phonograph, comical couplet theater songs) (1896)
 Geklibene lider (Selected songs) (Chicago: L. M. Shteyn, 1950)

References

 Chana Mlotek, Yiddish Forverts December 5, 2003, Yitzhak Reingold — der grester dikhter fun dervest (tsu zayn 100stn yortsayt).
 Zalmen Reyzen, Leksikon, vol. 4
 Geklibene lider, Isaac Reingold, Introduction by Anna Margolin
 https://yleksikon.blogspot.com/2019/07/yitskhok-reyngold-isaac-reingold.html

External links 

 http://chicagojewishhistory.org/pdf/2009/cjh_2009_4.pdf

1873 births
1903 deaths
Jewish American poets
Emigrants from the Russian Empire to the United States